A Night at the Movies can be:
 A Night at the Movies (film), a short film by humorist Robert Benchley
 "A Night at the Movies" (CSI), an episode of CSI: Crime Scene Investigation
 A Night at the Movies, a 1987 anthology by Robert Coover
 A Night at the Movies, a 1997 album by David Essex